Macrobrachium lar is a species of freshwater shrimp found throughout the Indo-West Pacific area, ranging from East Africa through to the Marquesas Islands and was first described in 1798. This species is found in flowing rivers and creeks near sea level.

References

Palaemonidae
Freshwater crustaceans of Asia
Crustaceans described in 1798